Mark De Man (born 27 April 1983) is a Belgian former professional footballer who played as a centre-back or right-back, most notably for Anderlecht. He moved to Dutch side Roda JC in the Eredivisie for an undisclosed fee in the 2008–09 season and then returned to Belgium to play for Germinal Beerschot. De Man made five appearances for the Belgium national team.

Club career
Born in Leuven, De Man played for OH Leuven during his youth before signing with Anderlecht in 1998. In 2002, he was promoted to Anderlecht's first team where he established himself as a starter in 2005.

In July 2008, with a year left on his contract with Anderlecht, De Man agreed a three-year contract with Eredivisie club Roda JC Kerkrade.

After featuring sparingly for Roda, he left the club for Germinal Beerschot. During his time at Germinal Beerschot, De Man was kept out of action by a knee injury and an ankle sprain. In his three seasons at the club he made few appearances and joined his youth club OH Leuven of the Belgian Second Division in January 2011.

In autumn 2011 De Man was close to a move to Scottish club Kilmarnock but after a trial with Kilmarnock, he moved the Belgian third division club KSC Hasselt.

International career
De Man received his first call-up to the Belgium national team in November 2006, for a UEFA Euro 2008 qualifier against Poland.

References

External links 
 
 
 
 

1983 births
Living people
Footballers from Flemish Brabant
Belgian footballers
Association football defenders
Belgium international footballers
Belgian Pro League players
Challenger Pro League players
Eredivisie players
Oud-Heverlee Leuven players
R.S.C. Anderlecht players
Roda JC Kerkrade players
Beerschot A.C. players
Sporting Hasselt players
Belgian expatriate footballers
Belgian expatriate sportspeople in the Netherlands
Expatriate footballers in the Netherlands
Sportspeople from Leuven